Minuscule 595 (in the Gregory-Aland numbering), ε 602 (von Soden), is a Greek minuscule manuscript of the New Testament, on paper. Palaeographically it has been assigned to the 16th century. The manuscript is lacunose. It was labelled by Scrivener as 468.

Description 

The codex contains the text of the four Gospels on 155 paper leaves (size ) with one lacunae (Matthew 1:1-5:44). The text is written in one column per page, 26 lines per page.

Text 

The Greek text of the codex Aland did not place in any Category. It was not examined by using the Claremont Profile Method.

It lacks Matthew 16:2b–3 (Signs of the times).

History 

Formerly the manuscript was housed at the monastery St. Michael de Muriano Nr. 49 in Venice. The manuscript was described by Mittarelli (1708–1777), along with the codex 419.

The manuscript was added to the list of New Testament manuscripts by Scrivener. It was examined by Dean Burgon.

The manuscript currently is housed at the Biblioteca Marciana (Gr. I,56 (1324)), at Venice.

See also 

 List of New Testament minuscules
 Biblical manuscript
 Textual criticism

References

Further reading 

 

Greek New Testament minuscules
16th-century biblical manuscripts